Shiori Shimizu (born 17 October 1996) is a Japanese professional footballer who plays as a goalkeeper for WE League club JEF United Chiba.

Club career 
Shimizu made her WE League debut on 20 September 2021.

References 

WE League players
Living people
1996 births
Japanese women's footballers
Women's association football goalkeepers
Association football people from Tokyo
JEF United Chiba Ladies players